Fresenius is a German surname. Notable people with the surname include:

 Carl Remigius Fresenius (1818–1897), German chemist
 Christian Fresenius (1749-1811), German Jurist and writer
 Eduard Fresenius ( (1874–1946), German businessman, founder of Fresenius
 Georg Fresenius (1808–1866), German botanist
 Wilhelm Fresenius (1913–2004), German chemist from Mainz

See also
 Fresenius SE, a German health care company, or subsidiaries

German-language surnames